{{safesubst:#invoke:RfD||2=South Ukraine counteroffensive|month = February
|day = 27
|year = 2023
|time = 16:51
|timestamp = 20230227165124

|content=
REDIRECT 2022 Kherson counteroffensive

}}